Dana is a city in Greene County, Iowa, United States. The population was 38 at the time of the 2020 census.

History
Dana was incorporated as a town in 1907. It is named for Samuel Dana, a pioneer settler.

Geography
Dana is located at  (42.106653, -94.240375).

Demographics

2010 census
As of the census of 2010, there were 71 people, 25 households, and 17 families residing in the city. The racial makeup of the city was 91.5% White and 8.5% African American. Hispanic or Latino of any race were 2.8% of the population.

There were 25 households, of which 32.0% had children under the age of 18 living with them, 52.0% were married couples living together, 8.0% had a female householder with no husband present, 8.0% had a male householder with no wife present, and 32.0% were non-families. 20.0% of all households were made up of individuals, and 4% had someone living alone who was 65 years of age or older. The average household size was 2.84 and the average family size was 3.00.

The median age in the city was 39.5 years. 29.6% of residents were under the age of 18; 9.9% were between the ages of 18 and 24; 16.8% were from 25 to 44; 35.3% were from 45 to 64; and 8.5% were 65 years of age or older. The gender makeup of the city was 52.1% male and 47.9% female.

2000 census
As of the census of 2000, there were 84 people, 29 households, and 20 families residing in the city. The racial makeup of the city was 100.00% White. Hispanic or Latino of any race were 5.95% of the population.

There were 29 households, out of which 41.4% had children under the age of 18 living with them, 51.7% were married couples living together, 3.4% had a female householder with no husband present, and 27.6% were non-families. 20.7% of all households were made up of individuals, and 6.9% had someone living alone who was 65 years of age or older. The average household size was 2.90 and the average family size was 3.29.

In the city, the population was spread out, with 31.0% under the age of 18, 11.9% from 18 to 24, 29.8% from 25 to 44, 19.0% from 45 to 64, and 8.3% who were 65 years of age or older. The median age was 31 years. For every 100 females, there were 104.9 males. For every 100 females age 18 and over, there were 114.8 males.

The median income for a household in the city was $33,750, and the median income for a family was $30,625. Males had a median income of $26,250 versus $21,250 for females. The per capita income for the city was $11,199. There were no families and 8.8% of the population living below the poverty line, including no under eighteens and none of those over 64.

Education
Residents are in the Greene County Community School District, which operates Greene County Elementary, Greene County Middle, and Greene County High schools in Jefferson.

The Grand Junction and Dana school districts consolidated in 1959 to form the East Greene Community School District. The Rippey School served as the East Greene district's elementary school, while middle and high school students attended school in Grand Junction. In 2012 elementary grades moved to Grand Junction while secondary students began attending schools operated by the Jefferson–Scranton Community School District. The East Greene and Jefferson–Scranton districts consolidated into the Greene County Community School District on July 1, 2014.

Notable people

References

Cities in Iowa
Cities in Greene County, Iowa
1907 establishments in Iowa